Battle Galleons is a water ride at the British theme park Alton Towers. The ride was installed in 2008, replacing the pay-per-play ride Splash Kart Challenge, which in turn replaced the original Swan Boat ride.

Located in the Mutiny Bay area, it follows a pirate ship theme. Riders and observers are able to fire water guns at each other.

References

Water rides manufactured by Mack Rides
Amusement rides introduced in 2008
Splash Battle rides